Cercospora mamaonis is a fungal plant pathogen.

References

mamaonis
Fungal plant pathogens and diseases